The Chairman may refer to:

 The Chairman (1964 film), a Soviet drama film
 The Chairman (1969 film), a spy film
 The Chairman (Jerry Goldsmith album), soundtrack album for the 1969 film
 The Chairman (M.I album), 2014
 :zh:董事長樂團, a Taiwanese band

See also
 Chairman